Veriato, formerly known as SpectorSoft, is a software company that develops and sells user behavior analytics and employee monitoring software.

It is based in Palm Beach Gardens, located in Palm Beach County, Florida in the United States.

History
Founded in 1998, the company was an early entrant in internet monitoring software.

In 2008, private equity firms Harbourvest Partners and WestView Capital Partners invested in the company, taking a majority ownership position.  SpectorSoft originally serviced both consumer and business customers, but no longer sells software for consumer or home use.

In 2011, the company opened their West Palm Beach office and London office.

In 2012 SpectorSoft acquired the assets of Corner Bowl Software.

On March 31, 2015, the company completely exited the consumer market.

In 2016 the company was renamed Veriato, Inc.

On June 12th, 2019, Veriato was acquired by Awareness Technologies.

Awards and honors
Spector Pro was given the PC Magazine editors' choice award in a 2002 review of six computer activity monitoring tools.
In 2004, version 5.0 of Spector Pro was again given the editors' choice award from a field of four programs.
In 2008 Spector 360 SR3 won the PC Magazine editors' choice award.
In 2004, SpectorSoft was listed for the first time as one of Inc. magazine's Top 500 fastest-growing private companies in America, at position 224.
The company achieved a position on the list once again in 2005 at number 497. 
In 2009 SpectorSoft made the list of Inc. 5000 Companies at number 3340. 
In 2010 and 2011 SpectorSoft again made the Inc. Magazine 500/5000 list.

Spectorsoft−Veriato products have been mentioned in ZDNET, PC/Computing, Time, CNN, NBC Nightly News, The New York Times and The Wall Street Journal.

In 2014, Spectorsoft won the SC Magazine Europe Best Fraude Prevention Award and the Best of Interop 2014 - Security Award  for their Spector 360 Recon product

Patent Infringement case
Patent Infringement Case Helios Software LLC et al. v. SpectorSoft Corporation has concluded.  In September 2014, the Court granted summary judgment of non-infringement as to the ‘571 and ‘237 Patents. In June 2015, after a five-day trial, a jury returned a verdict of no direct or indirect infringement by SpectorSoft of the ‘304 Patent, and also found several of the asserted claims of that patent invalid as both anticipated and rendered obvious by prior art (see Docket Entry No. 615 for Civ. No. 12-081-LPS).

See also 
Computer monitoring
Employee monitoring software

References 

Computer security software companies
Software companies based in Florida
Companies based in Palm Beach County, Florida
American companies established in 2016
Software companies established in 2016
2016 establishments in Florida
Software companies of the United States